John Perceval, 2nd Earl of Egmont, PC, FRS (24 or 25 February 17114 December 1770) was a British politician, political pamphleteer, and genealogist who served as First Lord of the Admiralty.

Early life
He was the son and heir of John Perceval, 1st Earl of Egmont, by his wife Catherine Parker. He was baptised at the Palace of Westminster, London. His two siblings were Lady Catharine Perceval (wife of Thomas Hanmer MP of The Fenns) and Lady Helena Perceval (wife of John Rawdon, 1st Earl of Moira).

His paternal grandparents were Sir John Perceval, 3rd Baronet of Lohort Castle and the former Catherine Dering (daughter of Sir Edward Dering, 2nd Baronet). His maternal grandparents were Sir Philip Parker, 2nd Baronet of Arwarton and the former Mary Fortray (a daughter of landowner and author Samuel Fortrey of Byall Fen).

He succeeded his father in 1748 as 2nd Earl of Egmont in the Peerage of Ireland.

Career 

Perceval sat in the Irish House of Commons for Dingle between 1731 and 1749. In April 1748, he was created Gentleman of the Bedchamber to the Prince of Wales. He was made a Privy Counsellor in January 1755.

He sat in the Parliament of Ireland for Dingle (1731–49) and in the House of Commons for Westminster (1741–47), Weobley (1747–54) and Bridgwater (1754–62). In 1762 he was created Baron Lovel and Holland, of Enmore in the County of Somerset, in the Peerage of Great Britain, which gave him an automatic seat in the House of Lords.

He was appointed joint Postmaster-General for 1762–3 alongside Robert Hampden, 4th Baron Trevor and served as First Lord of the Admiralty from 1763 to 1766.

From 1751 to 1757, he designed and created Enmore Castle at Enmore in Somerset, which received "the dismissive mockery of Horace Walpole".

Personal life

Perceval married twice. His first marriage was on 15 February 1737 to Lady Catherine Cecil, who was the second daughter of James Cecil, 5th Earl of Salisbury. Before her death on 16 August 1752, aged 33, they had five sons and two daughters:

 John Perceval, 3rd Earl of Egmont (29 January 1738 – 25 February 1822), eldest son and heir.
 Cecil Parker Perceval (19 October 1739 – 4 March 1753), died at Eton College.
 Philip Tufton Perceval (10 March 1742 –1795), a captain in the Royal Navy.
 Edward Perceval, (21 April 1744 –1824), a captain in the Royal Dragoon Guards, who married Sarah Howarth, daughter of John Howarth, in 1775.
 Catherine Perceval (20 February 1746 –1782), who married Thomas Wynn (1736–1807) (afterwards 1st Baron Newborough), in 1766.
Margaret Perceval (10 October 1748 –1750).
Frederick Augustus Perceval (11 February 1750 –1757).

His second marriage was to Catherine Compton, the third daughter of the Hon. Charles Compton and sister of Charles Compton, 7th Earl of Northampton and Spencer Compton, 8th Earl of Northampton, on 26 January 1756.  By Catherine Compton he had three sons and six daughters as follows:

 Charles George Perceval (1756–1840), eldest son, who succeeded his mother as Baron Arden in the peerage of Ireland, and was created a peer of the United Kingdom, with the title of Baron Arden of Arden in the county of Warwick
 Mary Perceval (d. 1839), who married Andrew Berkeley Drummond of Cadlands, Hampshire, a grandson of William Drummond, 4th Viscount Strathallan (died 1746), in 1781.
 Anne Perceval (15 December 1759 – 1 August 1772).
 Charlotte Perceval (b. 31 January 1761, d. 1761), who died an infant.
Spencer Perceval (1762–1812), who served as Prime Minister of the United Kingdom from October 1809 to May 1812.
 Elizabeth Perceval (d. 1846), who died aged 82, unmarried. 
Henry Perceval (1765–1772), who died aged 7. 
 Frances Perceval (b. 4 December 1767, d. 1817), who married John, 1st Baron Redesdale in 1803.
 Margaret Perceval (b. 17 March 1769, d. 1854), who married Thomas Walpole, sometime ambassador at Munich, a nephew of Horatio Walpole, 1st Earl of Orford, in 1803.

Lord Perceval died on 4 December 1770 at Pall Mall, London, aged 59. Following his death, his widow was created on 23 May 1770 Baroness Arden of Lohort Castle in the county of Cork in the peerage of Ireland, with remainder to her heirs male. She survived her husband and died at Langley, Buckinghamshire, on 11 June 1784, aged 53.

Legacy
Mount Egmont in New Zealand was named after him by James Cook in recognition of his encouragement of Cook's first voyage. While the mountain has returned to its original Maori name of Taranaki since the 2000s, the Egmont name still applies to the national park that surrounds the peak and geologists still refer to the peak as the Egmont Volcano.

References

External links 
 John Perceval, 2nd Earl of Egmont Manuscripts of the Earl of Egmont. Diary of Viscount Percival 1920 access date 3 March 2015
 Diary of George Marsh who worked in the Navy Office Manuscript of George Marsh
 

 

1711 births
1770 deaths
British MPs 1741–1747
British MPs 1747–1754
British MPs 1754–1761
British MPs 1761–1768
Irish MPs 1727–1760
Lords of the Admiralty
Perceval, John
Members of the Parliament of Ireland (pre-1801) for County Kerry constituencies
Members of the Privy Council of Great Britain
Fellows of the Royal Society
Whig members of the Parliament of Great Britain
Parents of prime ministers of the United Kingdom
Peers of Great Britain created by George III
Earls of Egmont